André Dochy (12 March 1928 – 31 October 2011) was a French weightlifter. He competed in the men's middleweight event at the 1952 Summer Olympics.

References

1928 births
2011 deaths
French male weightlifters
Olympic weightlifters of France
Weightlifters at the 1952 Summer Olympics
Sportspeople from Nord (French department)